Events in the year 1919 in Spain.

Incumbents
Monarch: Alfonso XIII
President of the Council of Ministers: 
 until 15 April: Álvaro de Figueroa, 1st Count of Romanones
 15 April-20 July: Antonio Maura
 20 July-12 December: Joaquín Sánchez de Toca
 starting 12 December: Manuel Allendesalazar y Muñoz de Salazar

Births
3 November - Jesús Blasco, comic book author (d. 1995)

Deaths
19 November - Florencio Constantino. (b. 1869)
Francisco Portusach Martínez, Governor of Guam (b. 1864)

References

 
Years of the 20th century in Spain
1910s in Spain
Spain
Spain